A1 Macedonia DOO Skopje is a telecommunications company in North Macedonia owned by A1 Telekom Austria Group. A1 offers broadband internet, cable and terrestrial television, mobile telephony and landline.

History
A1 Macedonia (then known as one.VIP) was created in 2015, when two of North Macedonia's mobile network operators, One and Vip merged to create the new company. One had been operating in the North Macedonia market since 2003 and Vip from 2007.

The merged company (one.vip) resulted in the Telekom Austria Group having a 55% interest in the newly created company and Telekom Slovenije Group having 45%. The agreement included the option for the exit of the Telekom Slovenije Group within three years of the transaction closing date.

This happened in 2017, when Telekom Slovenije sold their shares to Telekom Austria Group.

In May 2016, A1 Macedonia bought the local subsidiary of blizoo witch was largest cable operator in North Macedonia.

Branding

After the 2015, merger and creation of ONE.VIP, the company continued to offer products and services under the brands Vip, One, blizoo and BoomTV until May 2016 when the company began offering all products and services under the Vip brand.

On 3 September 2019, the company rebranded to A1.

Network information 
The IMSI – Network Codes of A1 are 294-02 and 294-03 and the MSISDN Network Codes are 075 (international: +389 75); 076 (international: +389 76); 077 (international: +389 77) and 078 (international: +389 78).

References

External links
 

Telecommunications companies of North Macedonia
Mobile phone companies of North Macedonia
Television in North Macedonia
Deutsche Telekom
Companies based in Skopje
Macedonian companies established in 2015
Telecommunications companies established in 2015